Almaty Region is a region in Kazakhstan, located in the southeastern part of the country. Its capital, from 1997 to 2022 was the city of Taldykorgan. But with the creation of the new Jetysu Region in 2022, Taldykorgan was chosen to be its capital and the capital of Almaty region was moved to the city of Kunayev.

Geography
Almaty Region surrounds the city of Almaty. The region borders Kyrgyzstan and Xinjiang in the People's Republic of China. The region also touches three other regions of Kazakhstan: Jambyl Region to the west, Karaganda Region to the northwest, and East Kazakhstan Region to the north. Almaty Region has an area of 224,000 square kilometres.

Much of the northwestern border of the region runs along  Lake Balkhash, whose main affluent, the  Ili River, is the most significant river of the region. In the region's northeast, it shares the four lakes of the Alakol Depression (Lakes Alakol, Sasykkol, Koshkarkol, and Zhalanashkol) with East Kazakhstan Region. Other lakes within the region include Bartogay Lake and Kapshagay lakes, Lake Issyk, Kaindy and Kolsai lakes.

The Trans-Ili Alatau branch of the Tian Shan Mountains extends from China and Kyrgyzstan into Almaty Region, along its southern border with Kyrgyzstan. Farther to the northeast, the Dzungarian Alatau runs along the region's border with China.
The Charyn Canyon is one of the region's famous scenic spots.

History
Alma-Ata Region,  the predecessor of today's Almaty Region, was created from the historical region of Zhetysu on March 10, 1932. Its capital was Alma-Ata (Almaty). Several times during the Soviet period, the north-eastern part of the region, centered on Taldykorgan, was separated from Alma-Ata Region, forming a separate Taldy-Kurgan Region, only to be merged into Alma-Ata Region again several years later.

In April 2001 the administrative center of Almaty Region was moved from Almaty to Taldykorgan. Thus Taldykorgan has become a regional capital again - this time without splitting the region.
Almaty region was formed on March 10, 1932 with a center in the city of Almaty. The region included 18 districts.
At the end of 1939, part of the districts was transferred to the Dzhambul and Semipalatinsk regions, 23 districts remained in the Alma-Ata region, including the newly formed 7.
In March 1944, Taldy-Kurgan Region was allocated from its structure, to which 11 districts were transferred.

Heads of the region
 Baiken  Ashymov  1968—1970
 Bimende Sadvokasov	1970—1972
 Aripbay  Alybaev 1972—1978
 Sakan  Kussainov 1978—1982
 Abubakir  Tynynybaev 1982—1986
 Vladislav  Anufriev 1986—1988
 Anatoly Zhigulin 1988—1990
 Saginbek  Tursunov 1990—1993
 Umirzak Uzbekov (1994-1996)
 Serik  Ahimbekov 1996—1997
 Zamanbek Nurkadilov (December 1997 - May 2001)
 Shalbai Kulmakhanov (May 2001 - August 11, 2005)
 Serik  Umbetov (2005-2011)
 Anzar Musakhanov (from April 13, 2011 to August 20, 2014) 
 Amandyk Batalov (from August 20, 2014)

Awards
On October 28, 1966, Alma-Ata region was awarded by Order of Lenin for its success in increasing the production and procurement of grain, meat, milk and other agricultural products.
On December 3, 1970, Alma-Ata region was awarded by the second Order of Lenin for the great successes achieved by the working people of the region in fulfilling the five-year plan for the development of industrial and agricultural production.

Administrative divisions
The region is administratively divided into seventeen districts and the cities of Konaev, Taldykorgan, and Tekeli.
 Aksu District, administrative center is Zhansugirov;
 Alakol District, the administrative center is Usharal;
 Balkhash District,  the administrative center is Bakanas;
 Enbekshikazakh District, the administrative center is  Esik;
 Eskeldi District, the administrative center is Karabulak;
 Ile District,  the administrative center is  Otegen Batyr;
 Karasay District, the administrative center is Kaskelen;
 Karatal District, the administrative center is Ushtobe;
 Kerbulak District, the administrative center is Sary-Ozek;
 Koksu District, the administrative center is Balpyk Bi;
 Kegen District, the administrative center is Kegen;
 Panfilov District, the administrative center is Zharkent;
 Raiymbek District, the administrative center is Narynkol;
 Sarkand District, the administrative center is Sarkand;
 Talgar District, the administrative center is Talgar;
 Uygur District, the administrative center is Chundzha;
 Zhambyl District, the administrative center is Uzynagash
 Taldykorgan city
 Konaev city
 Tekeli city

Climate 
The natural conditions of the Almaty region include 5 climatic zones - from deserts to eternal snows. The climate is sharply continental, the average January temperature in the lowlands is -15 C, in the foothills - 6-8 C; July - +16 C and + 24 + 25 C, respectively. The annual rainfall on the plains is up to 300 mm, in the foothills and mountains - from 500-700 to 1000 mm per year.

Ethnic composition
The share of Kazakhs, Russians, Uigurs by region census of 2009 year.
Subsequently, the ethnic composition underwent strong changes with the advent and collapse of the Soviet Union. At present, it is still multi-ethnic, however, Kazakhs absolutely prevail (72.07%), the share of Russians has greatly reduced to 13.33% of the region's inhabitants. The number of Uigurs is also significant (7.73%). The number of other Asian peoples - Turks, Kurds, Uzbeks, Kyrgyz, as well as Koreans does not exceed 4% in total. The numerous communities of Germans, Greeks, Poles, Ukrainians, and other European peoples, who were once living in Kazakhstan during the Soviet era, significantly decreased due to mass emigration to other countries after 1991.

Demographics

As of 2020, the Almaty Region has a population of 2,055,724.

Ethnic groups (2020):
Kazakh: 72.32%
Russian: 13.12%
Uyghur: 7.74%
Turkish: 1.84%
Azerbaijani: 0.86%
Others: 4.12%

Note: the population and ethnicity figures exclude the City of Almaty, which is administratively separate from the Almaty Region.

Historical Ethnic Composition  
In the 1989 census (excepting Alma-Ata):
Kazakhs: 54.2%.
Russians: 28.6%. 
Uigurs: 7.8%. 
Others: 9.4%.

In the 1999 census (excepting Almaty):
Kazakhs: 66.4%. 
Russians: 23.8%. 
Uigurs: 7.0%.
Others: 4.6%.

In the 2009 census (excepting Almaty):
Kazakhs: 68.2%. 
Russians: 22.8%. 
Uigurs: 6.2%. 
Other: 3.8%.

Sights
In 2021, the mountain cluster of the Almaty Region was selected as one of the top 10 tourism destinations in Kazakhstan. Other popular sights include: 
Lake Alakol - healing lake
Burkhan Bulak - highest waterfall
Altynemel - national park
Besqaynar - Ski resorts located 1500 metres above sea level
Kolsay
Khan Taniry
Kaindy
Balkhash
Tamgaly - a World Heritage Site (petroglyphs)
Charyn Canyon - Charyn National Park
Talgar - a region where the Issyk kurgan is located
Medeo - one of the most famous ice rinks in the world
Dostyk - a point of entry from China to Kazakhstan
Kapchagay Dam on the Ili River
Also in 2021, the tourism department of Kazakhstan announced that 15 huts for tourism shelter equipped with Wi-Fi, charging stations, and first-aid kits are planned to be constructed in the Almaty mountain area in the near future. The huts will be located in the middle and left Talgar, Kimasar, Tuyuk-Su, Upper Gorelnik, Big Almaty, Shukur and Prokhodnoye gorges.

Culture

- Taldykorgan Drama Theatre named after B.Rimova
Drama Theatre named after B.Rimova was opened on November 4, 1975. A group of young graduates of the Almaty State Conservatory named after Kurmangazy, who graduated from class of People's Artist of Kazakhstan Sholpan Zhandarbekova, opened the curtain of the theatre with the performance of G. Musrepov “Kozy Kurpesh-Bayan Sulu”.
On August 31, 2000, the theatre was named after People's Artist of Kazakhstan Biken Rimova, laureate of State Prize.
On October 30, 2018, they moved to a new building.

-«Museum of Applied Arts named after Master Darkembay»  PUSE
The total area is 3.0 hectares. Internal area of the museum - 375 square meters. The number of exhibits - 2437. The museum consists of 6 exhibition halls.
The number of people for excursion is 25 per a group.
Address: Almaty region, Enbekshikazakh district, Akshi village, Darkembai  avenue, house 1.

- Museum «Batyr babalar»
(Heroic ancestors)
The museum was built in 2016. It was opened in 2017within the framework of the program of the First President of the Republic of Kazakhstan Nursultan Nazarbayev «Course towards the future: modernization of Kazakhstan's identity».

- Ilyas Zhansugurov literary museum
It was opened in 1984 on the occasion of the 90th anniversary of the poet I. Zhansugurov. The museum is dedicated to the life and work of the poet.
The building of museum was constructed in 1905-1907. From 1918 to 1976 it was used as various institutions of the Soviet government: district branch of the regional union «Kosshy», the editorial office of the regional newspaper «October Flag», a laboratory for insemination of livestock, in 1976-1980 the regional museum of local lore. The total area of the museum is 271 square meters. The total number of exhibits is 6407. The building is under state protection as an example of architecture of the 19th century.

- Museum of victims of political repression
The building of  museum was constructed in 2018 in accordance with the decision of the akim of Almaty region A. Batalov in the framework of the program «Course towards the future: modernization of Kazakhstan's identity» of the First President of the Republic of Kazakhstan N. Nazarbayev.
The total area of the building is 535 square meters. Museum departments:
1. The history of repression in Kazakhstan in 1916-1986;
2. In memory of victims of political repression;
3. Historical and educational society «Adilet»  and its activities.
Museum funds are being replenished with materials relating to citizens who were subjected to political repression from the 1920s to the 1950s.

- Museum «Respect for Mother»
The museum was built in 2014, opened in 2015. The building area is 4987 square meters. Departments of the museum: on 2 floors there are 2 thematic halls:
1. craft and jewelry
2. Mother heroines.
Design capacity: 1 group of 30 people.

- «Abylkhan Kasteev Fine Art Gallery» 
The museum was created in 2004 for the 100th anniversary of the national artist Abylkhan Kasteev.
Total area - 427.0 square meters, Internal area of the gallery - 1200 square meters. The number of materials of museum significance is 166. The gallery consists of 9 rooms.
The number of people on excursion is 10 per group.
Address: Almaty region, Panfilovsky district, Zharkent, Yuldashev street, house number 9

- «Gallery of Fine Art» PUSE
It was founded in 2003. The number of materials of museum significance is 404. The total area is 1011.9 square meters, of which 10 exhibition halls - 674.0 square meters.
The number of people on excursion is 45 - 50 people per a group.
The gallery works in five areas:
• Research and assembly work.
• Scientific and fund work.
• Scientific and expositional work.
• Cultural and educational work.
Work with the media
Address: Almaty region, Taldykorgan, st. Kabanbay batyr 27 A

- PUI «Historical and Cultural Center «Atameken» of the First President of the Republic of Kazakhstan-Elbasy»
Put into operation on December 1, 2017.
All the exhibits collected in the golden fund of the center tell about the life of President Nursultan Nazarbayev from his childhood to the present day, when he became the Leader of independent Kazakhstan.
The total area is 3.5000 ha. The internal volume of the museum is 1249.5 square meters. The number of materials of museum significance is 649.
The center consists of 4 exhibition halls, there is a conference room for 16 seats.
Address: Almaty region, Karasai district, village Shamalgan, Zhibek Zholy street 158 / A.
 
http://kultura.zhetisu.gov.kz/

References

External links

Official regional website

 
Regions of Kazakhstan